The Thomas-Foreman Historic Home, also known as the Grant Foreman House, is a house in Muskogee, Oklahoma, United States, built by Judge John R. Thomas on a tract of prairie land. It was later named after Thomas' son-in-law, Grant Foreman, by the Muskogee Historical Society and the National Register of Historic Places.

Grant Foreman and his wife, Carolyn Thomas Foreman, each became notable historians who wrote a number of books and articles about Oklahoma history. On display are many of their possessions, including books and memorabilia, photos, documents and Native American works of art.

When Judge Thomas moved to Muskogee after being appointed to a newly created judgeship in 1897, he had difficulty finding a suitable property for the home he wished to build. He and his daughter, Carolyn, moved into the Adams House hotel until Thomas could get a house ready. The Thomases moved in during 1898.

Reportedly, there was only one small log cabin in the vicinity and no vegetation except grass. The judge planted 350 trees which provided fruit and shade. A large red oak tree in the northwest corner of the property is the only one of these original trees still standing. Carolyn and Grant collected a number of acorns while honeymooning in California in 1905. These apparently survived until the present.

Three Rivers Museum
The Grant-Foreman House is operated by the Three Rivers Museum.  The Three Rivers Museum was established in Muskogee in 1989 as the dream of local historian Dorothy Ball, chairman at that time of the Muskogee Historic Preservation Commission.  The main building of the museum, the formerly-abandoned Midland Valley Railroad Depot, was obtained in 1998 with federal grant funds.  Due to budget issues regarding maintenance and public access with respect to the Grant Foreman House owned by the Oklahoma Historical Society, the Museum voted in 2002 to contract with OHS to take over the operation of that site and make needed renovations.

Note

References

External links 
 Thomas-Foreman Historic Home - Three Rivers Museum
 Historic Homes of Muskogee Oklahoma

Biographical museums in Oklahoma
Historic house museums in Oklahoma
Houses on the National Register of Historic Places in Oklahoma
Literary museums in the United States
Museums in Muskogee County, Oklahoma
Buildings and structures in Muskogee, Oklahoma
Oklahoma culture
Houses in Muskogee County, Oklahoma
National Register of Historic Places in Muskogee County, Oklahoma
Tourist attractions in Muskogee, Oklahoma